Sant'Alvise is a church in the sestiere of Cannaregio in Venice, northern Italy. According to tradition, it was built by Antonia Venier in 1338 and dedicated to St. Louis of Toulouse, and located next to an adjacent convent.

The brick exterior and facade do not reflect the rich interior.

Interior 
It has a single nave, the current appearance dating from the 17th century restoration. On the interior facade above the entrance porch you can see a barco. A special piece on the counter-facade. Protected by wrought iron gates, behind which nuns could attend the religious services.

The ceiling was entirely frescoed by Pietro Antonio Torri and Pietro Ricchi in the same period.

To the right of the entrance are two canvases by Pietro della Vecchia depicting Theft of the body of St. Mark and The Saracens refuse to inspect the basket with the body of St. Mark, made as cartoons for mosaic decoration of St. Mark's Basilica. These are followed by a St. Louis consecrated bishop of Toulouse (Louis of Toulouse) attributed to Pietro Damini. Further along the right wall and in the presbytery are three large works by Giambattista Tiepolo, in order: Christ Reaching the Calvary, the Coronation of Thorns, and the Flagellation.

To the left of the entrance are small 15th-century tempera panels by Lazzaro Bastiani, depicting stories of Old Testament. It also contains a Portrait of a priest (1420) by Jacobello del Fiore. The first altar to the left has three statues attributed to Gianmaria Morlaiter. The last altar to the left has an Annunciation and Saints Augustine and Alvise by followers of Bonifacio de' Pitati. On the left wall of the presbytery is a Christ in the Garden by Angelo Trevisani.

Sources
Chorus Venezia entry.

External links

 Churches of Venice

Churches completed in 1338
14th-century Roman Catholic church buildings in Italy
Alvise
Gothic architecture in Venice
1338 establishments in Europe